Bánh đúc is a Vietnamese bánh (cake). There are two main types of bánh đúc, the white Northern Vietnamese cake and the green Southern version.

Northern Vietnamese version
In northern Vietnam, bánh đúc is a cake made from either non-glutinous rice flour or corn flour. It is white in color and has a soft texture and mild flavour. It is typically garnished with savory ingredients such as ground pork, tôm chấy (grilled ground shrimp), fried onions, sesame seeds, salt, peanuts, lime juice, and soy sauce or fish sauce. Although it may be eaten on its own, it may also be served hot, accompanied by steamed meat or mushrooms.

Bánh đúc is available at small stalls and is eaten throughout the day.

Southern Vietnamese version

In southern Vietnam, bánh đúc is a dessert made from non-glutinous rice flour. It takes the form of gelatinous blocks that are often colored green by the addition of Pandanus amaryllifolius leaf extract. It is cooked by boiling the ingredients and allowing them to cool, solidifying into a jelly-like sheet that is then cut into blocks.

Varieties
Bánh đúc bột gạo - made from (non-glutinous) rice flour
Bánh đúc bột năn dòn trong
Bánh đúc gân đá cẫm thạch - veined coloration resembles marble
Bánh đúc gạo - made from (non-glutinous) rice
Bánh đúc khoai môn - made with taro
Bánh đúc mặn - made with salt
Bánh đúc miền trung - made in the central region of Vietnam
Bánh đúc ngô - made from maize
Bánh đúc nộm - bánh đúc salad
Bánh đúc nóng - hot bánh đúc
Bánh đúc nước dừa - made with coconut milk
Bánh đúc nước cốt dừa - made with coconut juice
Bánh đúc sốt - steaming hot bánh đúc
Bánh đúc xanh - literally "green bánh đúc"; made with Pandanus amaryllifolius leaf extract

Sayings
The Vietnamese people have a saying:

The literal meaning is: "bones are never found in bánh đúc, just like a stepmother never loves her husband's own children." This couplet is used to describe something very unlikely to happen.

See also
Bánh da lợn
Pandan cake
Bánh

External links

Article about northern Vietnamese bánh đúc
Bánh đúc recipe
Bánh đúc article (Vietnamese)
Bánh đúc article (Vietnamese)
Articles on a variety of bánh đúc (Vietnamese)
Article about bánh đúc  (Vietnamese)
Article about bánh đúc (Vietnamese)

Banh duc
Rice cakes
Bánh